Robert Samuel Hodge (1866 – 8 April 1924) was a member of the Queensland Legislative Assembly.

Biography
Hodge was born at Bridgwater, Somerset, the son of James Hodge and his wife Mary Ann (née Baker). On his arrival in Australia He was a publican and storekeeper in Wondai and a produce merchant in Rosewood.

He married Mary Elizabeth Iszlaub (died 1935) at Ipswich in 1886 and together had three sons and three daughters. Hodge died at Corinda in April 1924 and his funeral proceeded from his residence, The Laurels in Corinda to St Matthew's Cemetery, Sherwood.

Public life
Hodge won the seat of Rosewood at the 1902 Queensland state election. He won again in 1904 by two votes but the Court Of Elections Tribunal, led by Judge Patrick Real overturned the result and in December 1904 awarded the seat to Labour's Denis Keogh.

In 1909 he stood again, this time as a Ministerial candidate for the seat of Burnett and was successful, defeating the sitting member, Alfred Jones. He only held Burnett for one term, switching to the new seat of Nanango in 1912, and now representing the Queensland Farmers' Union. He was defeated by fellow Farmer's Union member, James Edwards in 1920. He stood again in 1923 but was well beaten by both other candidates.

Legacy 
The locality of Hodgleigh in the South Burnett Region was named after him.

References

Members of the Queensland Legislative Assembly
1866 births
1924 deaths
National Party (Queensland, 1917) members of the Parliament of Queensland